Midway, Kansas may refer to:

 Midway, Crawford County, Kansas, an unincorporated community
 Midway, Kingman County, Kansas, an unincorporated community
 Midway, Rawlins County, Kansas, an unincorporated community